Mullaitivu Lighthouse was a lighthouse in Mullaitivu in northern Sri Lanka. Built in 1896, the  lighthouse had an iron skeletal tower. The lighthouse is believed to have been destroyed in 1996/97 during the Sri Lankan Civil War.

See also
 List of lighthouses in Sri Lanka

References

Buildings and structures in Mullaitivu
Lighthouses completed in 1896
Lighthouses in Sri Lanka